Mutant is a series of Swedish role-playing games that were developed and published by Target Games using their Äventyrsspel (Adventure games) brand. The current version is developed by Fria Ligan under license by Cabinet Entertainment and published in Swedish and English by Fria Ligan and Modiphius respectively. A video game adaptation named Mutant Year Zero: Road to Eden was released December 2018.

Publication history
Mutant (1984) was the second role-playing game published by Äventyrsspel after Drakar och Demoner, and like it, was based on the Basic Role-Playing system. Instead of a fantasy setting, however, Mutant adopted a setting full of mutants (humans with enhanced powers) and mutated animals (anthropomorphic intelligent humanoids with similar powers) in a post-apocalyptic Scandinavia. It was written by Gunilla Jonsson & Michael Petersén with illustrations by Nils Gulliksson. The game was expanded by Mutant 2 (1986) and published throughout the 1980s.

In 1989, however, Äventyrsspel completely reset the game with a second edition with a completely different setting (a cyberpunk setting heavily inspired by the Blade Runner movie) and new character options. This game was simply called Mutant, but is commonly referred to by fans as "new Mutant" (Nya Mutant in Swedish). 

Mutant RYMD (1992), which translates to "Mutant SPACE", changed the setting once again, by taking it out into the solar system. This iteration, however, was short-lived: after the English release of Kult came Mutant Chronicles (1993); this new edition was actually a synthesis, combining elements of Mutant RYMD and Kult — but removing all the religious elements from the latter, and, as a first for Target Games was released almost simultaneously in Sweden and in the US, as both a pen and paper role-playing game, collectible miniatures game (Warzone) and board game (Siege of the Citadel). The English translation of Mutant Chronicles was provided by Heartbreaker Hobbies and Games. 

After Äventyrsspel ceased publication the rights to the original (post-apocalyptic) Mutant game was picked up by Järnringen (The Iron Ring), who published their version Mutant: Undergångens arvtagare (2002). Where the original game, like many games published in the 80s, did not offer much world building; Undergångens Arvtagare considerably expanded on the premise of a fledgling Scandinavian civilization rising from the ruins, especially through the published campaign, eponymously called Undergångens Arvtagare (which translates to Heirs to the Apocalypse). Järnringen supported this line through 2008. This game was, like the old editions, never translated into English. It reached such a level of success with Swedish gamers that the next Mutant publisher, Free League, would reissue the 2002 rulebook in 2019.

In 2014 a new game in the franchise was released by Free League (Fria Ligan in Swedish), under license from Paradox Entertainment (the successor company of Target Games, now Cabinet Entertainment). Dubbed "Mutant - År Noll" the game uses the same premise as the original 1984 version, but once more offers a brand-new setting: the game world is set several hundred years earlier, when the apocalypse is still fresh and mutations are new and unstable. The Free League has published many related products available in several languages.

In 2020, after a successful Kickstarter campaign, Free League updated their setting with the Mutant: Hindenburg stand-alone game.  Set a generation after the events of the Undergångens Arvtagare campaign for the 2002 game, Hindenburg attempts to retrofit all three post-apocalyptic settings (the original 1984 game, Järnringens 2002 game and their own 2014 Mutant: Year Zero into one fictional history. This stand-alone game uses, much like most Free League products, a modified version of the Mutant: Year Zero engine.

1984 version

The campaign setting of the 1984 release was very similar to the world of the earlier American rpg Gamma World, a mostly undefined world taking place hundreds of years after a big catastrophe. The world is populated by humans, robots, and mutants (including anthropomorphic animals). The rule system was similar to the modified Basic Role-Playing rules used in Äventyrsspel's earlier Drakar och Demoner game, utilizing percentile dice. In 1986 a rules expansion called Mutant 2 was published that among other things introduced a more advanced skill system, advanced rules for combat, hit locations and a more developed campaign setting.

1989 version
In 1989 Äventyrsspel introduced a new version of Mutant (unofficially branded "New Mutant" to distinguish it from the older version). This version features a completely different campaign world: set the year 2089, the world is ruled by large corporations in gigantic cities. This was the first cyberpunk role-playing game in Swedish. The rules stayed roughly compatible with the old ruleset, but with more support for various firearms. Also a new character "class": androids to supplement robots and mutants.

Mutant RYMD and Mutant Chronicles
Mutant RYMD ("Mutant SPACE") was the next, short-lived, version of Mutant published in 1992. The campaign setting was similar to the 1989 version but in Mutant RYMD the corporations put much effort into space exploration and colonization, eventually reaching a fictional tenth planet named Nero and awakening an evil, supernatural force that attacks the solar system. Some of the monsters and symbols were taken from another of Äventyrsspel's role-playing games, Kult. The rules were more or less identical to that of the 1989 version of Mutant.

In 1993 Mutant RYMD was discontinued in favor of Mutant Chronicles, a game which inherited many aspects of RYMD's campaign setting. As a first for a Swedish rpg, Mutant Chronicles was released in English and with a focus on the international audience.

Mutant - Undergångens arvtagare
After the reconstruction of Target Games and the transfer of its intellectual property to Paradox Entertainment, a new version of Mutant was published under license to a company called Järnringen in 2002. This version, Mutant - Undergångens arvtagare ("Mutant - Heirs of the Apocalypse"), returned to the idea of the original, a post-apocalyptic campaign setting but then created a brand new civilization called Pyrisamfundet freely combining elements of 1700s, 1800s and 1900s Scandinavian society but still with mutated monsters and dangerous radiated zones. The rules of this edition are also based on Basic Role-Playing just like Äventyrsspel'''s early Swedish role-playing games, but isn't directly compatible to the original game.

Mutant - År Noll and Year Zero
In 2014 a new game in the franchise was released by Fria Ligan AB. In "År Noll", and in future expansions, players can play through the emergence of the mutants, the mutated animals, the robots and finally the non-mutated humans into the ravaged world. "År Noll" uses a custom set of rules based on the physical and psychological hardships of surviving in a post-apocalyptic world.

"År Noll" was translated into English and released as "Mutant - Year Zero" in December 2014. The first expansion to the Swedish version, "Genlab Alfa" was released in the spring of 2015. A German version of "År Noll" was released as "Mutant - Jahr Null" in 2018. All english language versions of the game is published under Fria Ligan's moniker Free League Publishing.

In 2015, Cabinet Holdings acquired Paradox Entertainment and all subsidiaries and their properties, including Mutant''.

Related products 
While there exists products other than table-top role-playing games under the Mutant brand, such as the 2018 video game Mutant Year Zero: Road to Eden, most efforts to diversify into video games, board games, collectible card games, miniatures, motion pictures etc have been made for the Mutant Chronicles brand - please see Mutant Chronicles § Spin-offs.

References

Post-apocalyptic role-playing games
Role-playing games introduced in 1984
Swedish role-playing games